Michelle Alaine Kepler (October 5, 1958 – February 1, 2008), was an American television actress best known for her work on General Hospital as "Nurse Amy Vining", from 1979 until 2002.

Early life
Kepler was born in Ohio, and her family moved to Arcadia, California when she was 10. She had one brother, Fred, who is named after their father.

Career
Kepler portrayed busybody nurse Amy Vining, a "fan favorite" and sister of Laura Spencer's, on General Hospital, from 1979 to 2002. She also appeared on the General Hospital spinoff Port Charles, other shows such as CHiPs and Three's Company, and the movie Homework (1982) with Joan Collins.

Kepler was also a businesswoman, who marketed a line of clothing on the former Home Shopping Club. In a 1994 Associated Press interview, she claimed that her "Lacy Afternoon" collection had earned more than $20 million in sales that year.

After her TV career ended, she moved to Portland, Oregon and was active in charitable fundraising.

Personal life
Kepler married and divorced twice, and had no children. She and her General Hospital costar Jacklyn Zeman (who played Barbara Jean "Bobbie" Spencer) were close friends.

Death
Kepler died from kidney failure, on February 1, 2008, at Oregon Health & Science University. Her close friend and General Hospital costar, Jacklyn Zeman, delivered a eulogy at her funeral. The February 26, 2008 episode of General Hospital was dedicated to Kepler, "In loving memory".

References

External links

Shell Kepler - Soapcentral.com
Shell Kepler at muchloved.com
Michelle Kepler, under the nickname, "Shell" at remembered.com

1958 births
2008 deaths
American soap opera actresses
Deaths from kidney failure
Actresses from Ohio
People from Painesville, Ohio
Actresses from Portland, Oregon
20th-century American actresses
21st-century American women